is a railway station in the Koumi Line in the city of Hokuto, Yamanashi Prefecture, Japan, operated by East Japan Railway Company (JR East).

Lines
Kai-Koizumi Station is served by the Koumi Line and is 7.1 kilometers from the starting point of the line at Kobuchizawa Station.

Station layout
The station consists of two ground-level opposed side platforms, connected by a level crossing. The station is unattended.

Platforms

History
Kai-Koizumi Station was opened on 27 July 1933 by the Japanese Government Railways. With the privatization of Japanese National Railways (JNR) on 1 April 1987, the station came under the control of JR East.

Passenger statistics
In fiscal 2010, the station was used by an average of 22 passengers daily (boarding passengers only).

Surrounding area
Yatsugatake South Base Observatory
Koizumi Post Office

See also
List of railway stations in Japan

References

 Miyoshi Kozo. Chuo-sen Machi to eki Hyaku-niju nen. JT Publishing (2009)

External links

  

Railway stations in Yamanashi Prefecture
Stations of East Japan Railway Company
Railway stations in Japan opened in 1933
Koumi Line
Hokuto, Yamanashi